Kostro is a surname. Notable people with the surname include:

Frank Kostro (born 1937), American baseball player
Jerzy Kostro (born 1937), Polish chess player